Nine ships of the Royal Navy have been named HMS Amazon, after the mythical female warriors.

 was a 26-gun frigate, formerly the French ship Panthère, built in 1744 and captured in 1745.  She was sold in 1763.
 was a 32-gun frigate launched in 1773 and broken up in 1794.
 was a 36-gun frigate launched in 1795 at Rotherhithe.
 was a 38-gun frigate launched in 1799 at Woolwich and broken up in 1817.
 was a 46-gun frigate launched in 1821. She was converted to carry 24 guns in 1844 and sold in 1863.
 was an  wooden screw sloop launched in 1865 and sunk on 9 July 1866 in a collision in the English Channel.
, launched in 1908, was a  destroyer stationed at Dover, England during the First World War.  She was broken up in 1919.
, launched in 1926, was a prototype destroyer, the first new build for the Royal Navy after World War I. She served in the Second World War, and was broken up in 1948.
, launched in 1971, was the first Type 21 frigate, and the only one not to take part in the Falklands War.  She was sold to Pakistan in 1993 and renamed Babur.

Battle honours
Ships named Amazon have earned the following battle honours:
Martinique, 1762
Droits de L'Homme, 1797
Copenhagen, 1801
Belle Poule, 1806
Belgian Coast, 1914−16
Atlantic, 1939−43
Norway, 1940
Malta Convoys, 1942
Arctic, 1942
North Africa, 1942−43

See also
 

Royal Navy ship names